Gregory James Campbell (born December 17, 1983) is a Canadian former  professional ice hockey centre and current Vice President of Player Personnel & Development/GM Charlotte Checkers (AHL).  He was drafted by the Florida Panthers in the third round, 67th overall, in the 2002 NHL Entry Draft. Campbell is the son of former NHL player and current NHL Director of Hockey Operations Colin Campbell.

Playing career

Amateur
Born in London, Ontario, Campbell grew up in nearby Tillsonburg, playing the majority of his minor hockey with the Tillsonburg Tornados BB teams of the OMHA Southern Counties League and the AAA Elgin-Middlesex Chiefs of the Alliance Pavilion League until Minor Bantam. He played in the 1996 Quebec International Pee-Wee Hockey Tournament with the New York Rangers minor ice hockey team.

Campbell was drafted by the Plymouth Whalers in the sixth round, 102nd overall, in the 1999 OHL Bantam Supplemental Draft after playing the 1998–99 season with the Aylmer Aces Jr.B. club.

Campbell was traded by Plymouth on August 2, 2002, to the Kitchener Rangers, along with a third-round draft pick, in exchange for Ryan Ramsey, Gary Klapowski and a second-round pick. According to the Rangers, Campbell was brought in to "fill the need for a strong forward to park in the crease area to play alongside Derek Roy on the Rangers top unit and especially on the powerplay, filling a gap left by graduating power forwards Jeff Szwez and John Osborne, who combined for 42 goals for the Rangers last season."

Campbell was a late invitee to the World Junior Championships camp, joining Rangers teammates Steve Eminger and Derek Roy at the camp. Campbell, along with Roy and Eminger (as well as former Bruins teammate Daniel Paille), were ultimately selected to play for Team Canada at the 2003 World Junior Championships, where they won the silver medal, falling to Russia in the tournament final.

Through 55 games for Kitchener, Campbell racked up 23 goals and 33 assists for 56 points playing alongside Derek Roy. In 21 playoff games, Campbell scored 15 goals and picked up four assists for 19 points with 34 penalties in minutes, leading his team to contend for the Memorial Cup in 2003. Campbell recorded one goal and six assists for seven points in four games in the tournament. He was named to the Memorial Cup All-Star Team along with Derek Roy, Mike Richards, Steve Eminger, Doug O'Brien and Scott Dickie. Campbell was also awarded the Ed Chynoweth Trophy as the tournament's leading scorer and the George Parsons Trophy as most sportsmanlike player.

Professional
Campbell was drafted 67th overall by the Florida Panthers in the 2002 NHL Entry Draft. He played two NHL games in 2003–04, but did not register a point in the contests. He scored his first goal in the 2005–06 NHL season in a 4–3 loss to the Montreal Canadiens against goaltender Yann Danis. 

On June 22, 2010, Campbell was traded by the Panthers, along with Nathan Horton, to the Boston Bruins in exchange for Dennis Wideman and a first-round draft pick (15th overall) in 2010 and a third-round pick in 2011.

In the 2010–11 season, Campbell set a career high in penalty minutes (93) and tied a career high in goals (13). During the 2011 Stanley Cup playoffs, he centred the Bruins' top penalty killing unit, which notably neutralized the potent Vancouver Canucks' power play in the Stanley Cup Finals, limiting them to just two power play goals through the seven-game series. On June 15, 2011, Campbell won the Stanley Cup with the Bruins. At the end of the next off-season, on June 12, 2012, he re-signed a three-year, $4.8 million contract extension.

On June 5, 2013, during Game 3 of the Eastern Conference Finals, Campbell suffered a broken right fibula after throwing himself in front of an Evgeni Malkin slapshot during a crucial penalty kill against the Pittsburgh Penguins. Campbell regained his footing, however, and despite being unable to put any pressure on his right leg, he remained on the ice for more than a minute. In doing so, he helped kill off the Penguins power play before painstakingly skating himself to the bench. While Campbell exited the Ice, Bruins fans were heard to be chanting "Campbell, Campbell!" in support of the beloved Bruin.  The Bruins went on to win the game 2–1 in double overtime, ultimately progressing to the Finals against the Chicago Blackhawks.

After five seasons with the Bruins, Campbell left as a free agent and signed a two-year contract with the Columbus Blue Jackets on July 1, 2015. On December 17, 2016 Columbus put Campbell on unconditional waivers. Campbell was released on December 19. Reports state that Campbell was unwilling to move to the Blue Jackets minor league system. Campbell officially retired on June 9, 2017, and joined the Columbus Blue Jackets as a developmental coach the same day.

Career statistics

Regular season and playoffs

International

See also
Notable families in the NHL

References

External links

1983 births
Boston Bruins players
Canadian ice hockey centres
Canadian people of Scottish descent
Columbus Blue Jackets coaches
Columbus Blue Jackets players
Florida Panthers draft picks
Florida Panthers players
Ice hockey people from Ontario
Kitchener Rangers players
Living people
Plymouth Whalers players
Rochester Americans players
San Antonio Rampage players
Sportspeople from London, Ontario
Sportspeople from Tillsonburg
Stanley Cup champions
Canadian ice hockey coaches